The year 1645 in music involved some significant events.

Events 
Juan Hidalgo de Polanco becomes leader of the chamber musicians at Spain's royal court.

Publications 
Giovanni Battista Abatessa – Intessatura di varii fiori..., a collection of guitar music, published in Naples

Classical music 
 Girolamo Frescobaldi – Canzoni alla francese, a posthumous print
 Cornelis Thymanszoon Padbrué -  't Lof Jubals, Op. 4, a collection of madrigals and motets

Opera
Giovanni Faustini – Doriclea

Births 
February 9 – Johann Aegidus Bach, organist and conductor (died 1716)
February 22 (twins)
Johann Ambrosius Bach, musician (died 1695)
Johann Christoph Bach, musician  (died 1693)
November 30 – Andreas Werckmeister, organist and composer (died 1706)

Deaths 
April 16 – Tobias Hume, soldier, viol player and composer (born c.1569)
September 24 – William Lawes, English composer (born 1602)
date unknown – William Smith, composer (born 1603)